Caloptilia coruscans is a moth of the family Gracillariidae. It is known from south-western Europe and Thrace.

The larvae feed on Pistacia atlantica, Pistacia lentiscus, Rhus doica, Rhus oxyacanthoides and Schinus molle. They mine the leaves of their host plant. The mine starts as an epidermal, whitish or brownish corridor. Later it becomes a blotch. The mine can be either upper- or lower-surface. In the end, the mine is somewhat contracted and has fine folds. Older larvae live freely, in a rolled leaf.

References

coruscans
Moths described in 1907
Moths of Europe